Bolton Arena is a multi-purpose indoor arena, located at Middlebrook on the boundary between Horwich and Lostock in the Metropolitan Borough of Bolton, Greater Manchester, England. It has a seating capacity of 6,000 people and hosts indoor sporting events.

The facility also includes a tennis centre with eight indoor acrylic courts and two floodlit clay courts, which is one of the Lawn Tennis Association's nineteen High Performance Centres.

Construction
The arena was designed for Bolton Council and its partners Sport England and the Lawn Tennis Association by Bolton architects Bradshaw Gass & Hope who also acted as lead consultants and Structural Engineers to the project, although, the concept design was developed initially as a joint venture between the former Borough Architect, Patrick Taylor and Mark Head, then a partner of Bradshaw Gass and Hope. Construction took place between October 1999 and February 2001 and cost £10,000,000.

The arena opened its doors to the public in April 2001 and celebrated its official opening on the 14 July 2001.

Events
During the 2002 Commonwealth Games, it hosted the badminton competition. It also serves as the hometown venue for boxer Amir Khan.

Between March 4 and March 6 of 2011, it played host to Great Britain's 2011 Davis Cup Europe/Africa Zone Group II First Round Match against Tunisia. Great Britain won 4-1 to advance to the second round of the Davis Cup Europe/Africa Zone Group II.

See also

List of Commonwealth Games venues

References

External links

Indoor arenas in England
2002 Commonwealth Games venues
Buildings and structures in the Metropolitan Borough of Bolton
Sport in the Metropolitan Borough of Bolton
Bradshaw, Gass & Hope buildings